The year 1814 in architecture involved some significant events.

Buildings and structures

Buildings completed

 Craigellachie Bridge, Scotland, designed by Thomas Telford, is completed.
 Pont d'Iéna over the Seine in Paris, commissioned by Napoleon I of France in 1807, is completed.
 Iglesia de San Juan Bautista (Chiclana de la Frontera), Spain, designed in 1776 by Torcuato Cayón, is completed.
 St George's Church, Everton, England, designed by ironfounder John Cragg with Thomas Rickman, is consecrated.
 St George's Church, Charlotte Square, New Town, Edinburgh, Scotland, designed by Robert Reid, is completed.
 Chapel Royal, Dublin, designed by Francis Johnston, is completed.
 Lough Cooter Castle, Gort, Ireland, designed by John Nash, is completed.
 Middletown Alms House in Connecticut is completed.
 Narva Triumphal Arch in Saint Petersburg, Russia, designed by Giacomo Quarenghi, is built in wood; it is rebuilt in stone between 1827 and 1834.
 Saheb Ettabaâ Mosque in Tunis, construction led by Ben Sassi, is completed.
 Museum, Palace and St Stephan Catholic Church in Karlsruhe (Baden), designed by Friedrich Weinbrenner, are completed.

Awards
 Grand Prix de Rome, architecture: Charles Henri Landon and Louis Destouches.

Births
 January 27 – Eugène Viollet-le-Duc, French architect and architectural theorist (died 1879)
 February 10 – Harvey Lonsdale Elmes, English architect (died 1847)
 March 9 – James William Wild, English decorative architect to the Great Exhibition of 1851 (died 1892)
 April 16 – Miklós Ybl, Hungarian architect (died 1891)

 May 26 – Wilhelm Engerth, Austrian architect and engineer (died 1884)
 September 7 – William Butterfield, English ecclesiastical architect (died 1900)

Deaths
 August 17 – John Johnson, English architect and Surveyor to the County of Essex (born 1732)
 December 19 – Giuseppe Venanzio Marvuglia, Italian architect (born 1729)
 date unknown – Giuseppe Pistocchi, Italian Neoclassical architect (born 1744)

References

Architecture
Years in architecture
19th-century architecture